Snelland railway station was a station in Snelland, Lincolnshire, opened in 1848 as part of the Sheffield and Lincolnshire Extension Railway. and closed in 1965.

References

External links

Disused railway stations in Lincolnshire
Railway stations in Great Britain opened in 1848
Railway stations in Great Britain closed in 1965
Former Great Central Railway stations
1848 establishments in England
1965 disestablishments in England